The 1908 European Figure Skating Championships were held on January 18 in Warsaw. Warsaw was part of the Russian Empire at this time. Elite figure skaters competed for the title of European Champion in the category of men's singles.

Results

Men

Judges:
 Ludwig Fänner 
 Z. Goebel  (Poland)
 K. Bevensee 
 S. Uleniecki 
 P. Weryho  (Poland)

References

Sources
 Result list provided by the ISU

European Figure Skating Championships, 1908
European Figure Skating Championships
European 1908
International figure skating competitions hosted by Russia
Sports competitions in Warsaw
1908 in the Russian Empire
1908 in Poland 
1908 in Polish sport 
20th century in Warsaw
January 1908 sports events